Rear Admiral John Marshall Bowyer (19 June 1853 – 15 March 1912) was an officer in the United States Navy.

Bowyer was born in Cass County, Indiana; and in 1870, he was appointed to the United States Naval Academy from Iowa. He graduated from the Naval Academy in 1874.

Ensign Bowyer served aboard the ship  attached to the Northwestern Lake station. From 1881 through 1884, he was on the sloop  in the Pacific.

In 1887, he was assigned to special instruction in the torpedo service. Then he was detailed to the Asiatic Station where he served aboard the screw sloop . Bowyer returned to the Naval Academy from 1891 through 1894.

He was promoted to Lieutenant Commander in 1899.

In 1901, Lieutenant Commander Bowyer was assigned to ordinance duty at the Washington Navy Yard.

Bowyer reached the rank of captain in 1907. He commanded the battleship  on the "Great White Fleet" cruise around the world. Then he commanded the battleship , the flagship of the Atlantic Fleet.

Captain Bowyer was the superintendent of the Naval Academy at Annapolis from June 10, 1909, through May 15, 1911.

Bowyer reached flag rank in September 1911; and he retired from the Navy with the rank of rear admiral.

Notes

References
  "Admiral Bowyer of Annapolis Dead; He Retired as Superintendent of the Naval Academy in September Last; Was only 59 years old; He Commanded the Illinois on the Famous Cruise Around the World," New York Times. March 16, 1912.
  "Navy Board Retires Fourteen Officers; Some Well Worth Keeping in Service, but Must Make Way for Younger Men.", The New York Times July 4, 1911.

1853 births
1912 deaths
United States Naval Academy alumni
Superintendents of the United States Naval Academy